A total solar eclipse occurred on November 12, 1966. A solar eclipse occurs when the Moon passes between Earth and the Sun, thereby totally or partly obscuring the image of the Sun for a viewer on Earth. A total solar eclipse occurs when the Moon's apparent diameter is larger than the Sun's, blocking all direct sunlight, turning day into darkness. Totality occurs in a narrow path across Earth's surface, with the partial solar eclipse visible over a surrounding region thousands of kilometres wide.
The path of totality cut a swath across South America from north of Lima, Peru, passing the northeastern tip of Chile, Bolivia, 
Northwest of Argentina, southwestern tip of Ñeembucú Department in Paraguay, nearly to the southernmost tip of Brazil.

Observations

The NASA Gemini XII mission observed this total eclipse from space:
The Canary Island controller greeted the crew in the morning with the news that there would be a second maneuver - 5 meters forward - to line the vehicles up properly. The prospects panned out richly, and the crew reported seeing the eclipse "right on the money at 16:01:44 g.e.t." Although the crew thought for a moment that they were slightly off track, their aim had actually been accurate. 

The 28 October 1966 launch of the U.S. Air Force's Orbiting Vehicle 3-2 (OV3-2) was timed such that it could observe ambient charged particle variations before, during, and after the eclipse.

Related eclipses

Solar eclipses of 1964–1967

Saros series 142

Metonic series

Notes

References

1966 11 12
1966 in science
1966 11 12
November 1966 events